Huntley  may refer to:

Places

Australia
Huntley, New South Wales (Orange), in City of Orange
Huntley, New South Wales (Wollongong), a suburb of Wollongong, New South Wales

Canada
Huntley, Prince Edward Island
Huntley Township, Ontario

England
Huntley, Gloucestershire
Huntley, Staffordshire, a UK location

United States
Huntley, Illinois
Huntley, Minnesota
Huntley, Montana
Huntley, Nebraska
Huntley, Wyoming

Other uses
Huntley (name)
Huntley (plantation) near Washington, DC
Huntley Project, an irrigation project in southern Montana 1907
Huntley & Palmers, notable British firm of biscuit makers

See also

 
Huntly (disambiguation)
Hundley, a surname
Hunley (disambiguation)